Zwemer Hall,  is a historic building located on the campus of Northwestern College in Orange City, Iowa, United States.  It was built in 1894 to house what was then called the Northwestern Classical Academy.  Mankato architect George Pass, Sr. was responsible for designing the Romanesque Revival building.  It is named after the Rev. James F. Zwemer, a Reformed Church in America clergyman, professor and college administrator. The 2½-story brick structure is built on a raised limestone basement.  The building measures  and the tower on the north side rises .  While utilized for a variety of academic purposes over the years, it is now used as the college's administration building.  Zwemer Hall was listed on the National Register of Historic Places in 1975, and extensively renovated in 1995.

References

School buildings completed in 1894
Romanesque Revival architecture in Iowa
University and college administration buildings in the United States
University and college buildings on the National Register of Historic Places in Iowa
Buildings and structures in Sioux County, Iowa
National Register of Historic Places in Sioux County, Iowa
Northwestern College (Iowa)
1894 establishments in Iowa